Marithiel or Marrithiyal may be,

Marrithiyal people
Marrithiyel language